The women's water polo tournament at the 2018 Mediterranean Games was held from 27 to 30 June 2018 at the Campclar Aquatic Center in Tarragona, Spain.

Participating teams

 (host)

Preliminary round

Group A
All times are CEST (UTC+2).

Group B
All times are CEST (UTC+2).

Final round

5th place match
All times are CEST (UTC+2).

Bronze medal match
All times are CEST (UTC+2).

Gold medal match

All times are CEST (UTC+2).

Final standings

References

External links
2018 Mediterranean Games

Water polo at the 2018 Mediterranean Games